The Women's Downhill competition of the Calgary 1988 Olympics was held at Nakiska on Friday, February 19. The race was delayed a day due to high winds on Thursday.

The defending world champion was Maria Walliser of Switzerland, while teammate Michela Figini was the defending Olympic and World Cup downhill champion and led the current season.

West Germany's Marina Kiehl won the gold medal, Brigitte Oertli of Switzerland took silver, and Karen Percy of Canada was the bronze medalist; Walliser was fourth and Figini finished ninth.

Results
The race was started at 10:00 local time, (UTC −7).

References

External links
FIS results

Women's downhill
Alp
Oly